Baazi Kiski is a game show on Zee TV channel which premiered on 2 September 2001. The game show is hosted by popular villain actor Ashutosh Rana, and involves a gender-war between men and women for a total cash prize of Rs 21,000 per contestant. The show replaced Zee TV's game show Sawaal Dus Crore Ka, which did not meet audiences expectations.

Overview
The show revolves around the concept of gender battle between 'men vs. women'. It comprised 5 rounds starting with the elimination round; hence the process of eliminating the participant (man or woman) until that participant get to face each other on a one-to-one basis. The game show contains a buzzer round and prizes being given away in cash. Besides offering the cash prize, there are other prizes that are offered in the game, such as refrigerators, cars and television sets.

Rating
Baazi Kiski was a fairly successful series, usually finishing in the top 16 shows for the weeks in which it aired. Despite not getting the desired TRPs, the show managed to cling the title of the best rated programme among the 16 programmes that were launched simultaneously by Zee TV channel in prime time. In fact, the show was at No 2 among all the game shows on all Indian networks that aired in the year 2001. The following are the list of game shows on various Indian television networks that Baazi Kiski was compared to:

††Source: TAM Peoplemeter, September 2001

References

External links
News Article on Apunkachoice.com
Baazi Kiski News Article by Sunday Tribune

2001 Indian television series debuts
Indian game shows
Zee TV original programming